The Droughtmaster is an Australian breed of beef cattle. It was developed from about 1915 in North Queensland by crossing zebuine cattle with cattle of British origin, principally the Beef Shorthorn. It was the first Australian taurindicine hybrid breed; it is approximately 50% Bos indicus and 50% Bos taurus.

History 

The Droughtmaster was developed from about 1915 in North Queensland by crossing zebuine cattle with cattle of British origin, principally the Beef Shorthorn. Other British breeds, mainly Hereford, were later used. Much of the development was done by one breeder, R.L. Atkinson.

In 1956 breeders decided to focus on red cattle only; the Droughtmaster name proposed by Atkinson was adopted. A breed society, the Droughtmaster Stud Breeders' Society, was formed, and a herd-book was started.

From 1969, five Droughtmaster bulls were used for cross-breeding with the local Bhagnari in the Baluchistan province of Pakistan, leading to the creation of the Nari Droughtmaster. It has also been exported to other countries, among them New Guinea, Nigeria, Samoa and Taiwan.

Characteristics 

Droughtmasters have good walking and foraging abilities, coupled with lower nutritional requirements to give them the ability to retain condition and keep breeding, irrespective of the prevailing conditions. Their short coat is generally red in colour, although variations from golden honey to dark red can occur. The red pigmentation in Droughtmasters helps protect the cattle from cancer eye, sunburnt udders and photosensitisation. The cattle may be either horned or polled; the majority are polled and exhibit only a moderate hump. They have an extended dewlap.

Use 

It is a beef breed, and is reared particularly in areas with a high incidence of drought, heat, tick-borne disease and sun damage.

References

Further reading 
 Stephens, M (et al.), Handbook of Australian Livestock, Australian Meat & Livestock Export Corporation, 2000 (4th ed), 

Cattle breeds originating in Australia
Cattle breeds